Vanakkam Chennai is a 2013 Indian Tamil-language romantic comedy film written and directed by debutant Kiruthiga Udhayanidhi. Produced by her husband Udhayanidhi Stalin under the banner Red Giant Movies, the film stars Shiva and Priya Anand, with Santhanam and Rahul Ravindran portray supporting roles. The music is scored by Anirudh Ravichander, and cinematography was handled by Richard M. Nathan, and editing by T. S. Suresh. The film released worldwide on 11 October 2013, and received positive reviews from critics.

Plot 
Ajay, an educated youth comes to Chennai from his hometown, Theni to take up a job. Anjali, a photographer from London is also in the city to capture the South Indian culture on camera. The duo are deceived by Narayanan, a real estate broker, who rents out unoccupied houses without informing the house owners. Ajay and Anjali pay the rental money to Narayanan and end up signing the same house. Unable to find another house to rent, the duo decide to stay together, till they find Narayanan. They squabble and argue a lot, but soon Ajay falls in love with Anjali. However, he does not reveal to her of his feelings. After taking her on a trip to Theni, he realises that she does not reciprocate his feelings, leaving him depressed.

Soon, Ajay tracks down Narayanan, who he met in a chance encounter earlier, where Ajay pockets Narayanan's address from his wallet, and blames him for the misery in his life, because it was Narayanan's trickery that brought them together and now, Ajay cannot live without her love. Narayanan decides to help Ajay and he visits the house, under the pretense of being Ajay's friend, Billa Senthil. He tries to make Anjali fall for Ajay. Anjali's fiancé, Deepak then gives Anjali a surprise visit, just as when she begins to enjoy Ajay's company. Narayanan continues to try to getting Ajay and Anjali together, but with no success.

On the night of Anjali's birthday, Ajay decides that she will never love him, and resorts to drinking, after being depressed. Meanwhile, Anjali realises that she loves Ajay, but is angry at his behaviour under the influence of alcohol. The next day, she goes to the wedding of Ajay's colleague as his wife, due to the fact that his colleagues think she is his wife and looks for him there. Just when they find each other and are about to confess their feelings for one another, Narayanan speaks on the phone with some new tenants. When he jokingly offers Ajay a cut of the deal, Anjali misunderstands Ajay as a fraudster, assuming that he also was in the same house plot Narayanan created. Heartbroken, Anjali shouts at both of them as tricksters and leaves the wedding hall in tears. Shattered, Ajay looks on in guilt.

Three months later, Anjali has returned to London and wins her photography contest. Deepak tells her that Narayanan had told him everything from scratch, and that Ajay is innocent. He convinces her that she loves Ajay and vice versa, as she did not hesitate to visit Theni or act as Ajay's wife despite being engaged to Deepak. Anjali comes back to their apartment, and looks for Ajay, but does not find him. At the same moment, Ajay opens the door and finds his passport that he was looking for. Anjali meets him at last and is initially upset at him. She asks him why he did not come to woo her for the last three months in London. Ajay tells her that he had just received his passport and was planning to leave for the airport. As the two hug and reconcile, Narayanan enters, with a prospective victim to trick, and shows him the house. The two shout at Narayanan and comically punch him in front of the new tenant. The film concludes showing the same deceiving trick that brought the couple together.

Cast 

 Shiva as Madasamy (Ajay)
 Priya Anand as Anjali Rajamohan
 Santhanam as Narayanan (Billa Senthil)
 Rahul Ravindran as Deepak
 Urvashi as Inspector Chandra
 Renuka as Ajay's mother
 Nizhalgal Ravi as Rajamohan
 Manobala as Constable Narayanan
 Pandi as Murali
 Swaminathan as Ponnurasu
 Aarthi as Ponnatha
 Rajkumar as Vasu
 Misha Ghoshal as Leena
 Sangeetha as Girija
 Crane Manohar
 Nassar as Colonel Balasubramaniam in a guest appearance
 Udhayanidhi Stalin in a guest appearance as Flat Tenant

Anirudh Ravichander, Adhi of Hiphop Tamizha, Hard Kaur and Robert appear in the song "Chennai City Gangsta".

Production 
Priya Anand with Shiva cast as the Lead. Santhanam appeared in a crucial segment in the second half. The film's principal photography officially began on 1 February 2013 at ECR, Chennai. The director also started working with an environmentalist Abdul to set up a system on the set to educate everyone on environment friendly projects. The film will be released in Dolby Atmos.

Responding to criticism that the film is a blatant copy of 1955 movie Missamma, Kiruthiga denied them as rumours. Although the film is positively reviewed, it is heavily inspired by 2002 Malayalam film Yathrakarude Sradhakku starring Jayaram and Soundarya.

Soundtrack 

The film's score and soundtrack is composed by Anirudh Ravichander. The album was a blockbuster hit from the young composer further elevating the movie's success and was released on 27 July 2013 at Suryan FM and reached top spot in iTunes India Top Album category within few days of its release. The album consists of seven songs and he will be teaming up with Vishal Dadlani for Oh Penne song. Also in the album are Singers Arjun, Vishal Dadlani, Hiphop Tamizha, Pragathi Guruprasad from 'Super Singer' & Hard Kaur. Lyrics for "Engadi Porandha" was written by Vignesh Shivan, director of Podaa Podi.

Critical reception 
Vanakkam Chennai received positive reviews from critics. S Saraswathi of Rediff said, "Vanakkam Chennai is a fun-filled, but slow paced romantic film that does not boast of a great or original storyline. But there is simplicity and charm in the characters. And the great music certainly keeps you entertained." Prashanth Reddy of Desimartini said, "Anirudh's music is a huge positive and I can't seem to get a few of the background tunes out of my head. Priya Anand looks utterly gorgeous in every frame. But "Vanakkam Chennai" is still just an okay-ish Rom-com that is hard to hate. It is does very little to reinvigorate a stagnant genre. Also, it should have avoided using Santhanam." Baradwaj Rangan of The Hindu called it "A low-key bliss-out for the most part."

Behindwoods said, "The first half trots along merrily with Ajay (Shiva) and Anjali (Priya Anand) indulging in one-upmanship that stirs up several laughs and saves the audience the trouble of wondering about the story's progress. But the second half, despite Santhanam's shenanigans, plays out more like a drama. This in turn stretches the movie to a running time of 2 hours and 31 minutes and much like Rosy Aunty, Vanakkam Chennai too takes its own time to say goodbye." IndiaGlitz said, "Though a rather predictable story, the knack of this success lies in the way it has been wrapped and presented. As you sit through the movie, it is natural for anyone to forget that Kiruthiga is a debutante director for, she has worked this movie to perfection in every frame." Sify said, "The film has nothing new to offer but is still enjoyable due to its glossy packaging, rich visuals and lots of fun. It’s a charming film made with heart. Give it a chance, you won’t be disappointed."

References

External links 
 

2010s Tamil-language films
2013 films
Films scored by Anirudh Ravichander
Films set in Chennai
Films set in London
Films set in Theni
Films using stop-motion animation
Indian films with live action and animation
Indian romantic comedy films
2013 directorial debut films
2013 romantic comedy films